George Handel Heath-Gracie  (4 June 1892 – 20 April 1987) was an English musician. He was Head Teacher at Derby School of Music (1938–1944), a composer and cathedral organist, who served in Derby Cathedral.

George Handel Heath-Gracie was born in Gosport, Hampshire, and educated at Bristol Grammar School.

He was the organist of St. Peter's Church, Brockley, Kent (1918–1933) and Derby Cathedral (1933–1958).

References

1892 births
1987 deaths
People educated at Bristol Grammar School
People from Gosport
English classical organists
British male organists
Cathedral organists
20th-century organists
20th-century British male musicians
20th-century classical musicians
Male classical organists